Like One of the Family is a novel by Alice Childress. It was originally published in 1956 by Independence Publishers in Brooklyn, New York. It was re-published by Beacon Press in Boston in 1986. Each chapter, 62 in all, is told from the perspective of Mildred, a domestic worker in New York City, to her friend Marge, also a domestic worker. The chapters originally appeared with the title "Conversation from Life" in the Black Marxist newspaper Freedom (founded by Paul Robeson), and later were published in the Baltimore Afro-American. Literary scholar Trudier Harris notes that, in creating Mildred, "Childress may have been influenced by Langston Hughes's Jesse B. Simple... a gregarious, beer-loving, bar-hopping Harlemite who shared his adventures in the white world and his homely philosophies."

References 

1956 novels
Novels set in New York City
Novels first published in serial form
African-American novels